Josef Schmid (Holzhausen Bad Aibling, 26 January 1883 – Munich, 4 September 1975) was a German Catholic theologian. He was professor of New Testament and hermeneutics at the Ludwig Maximilians University in Munich. He published a standard work on the Greek text of the Book of Revelation (1956). He also made an important contribution towards the reconstruction of the Q-source, a lost source used by both Matthew and Luke to write their gospels.  then, later, studies on the Gospel of Mark.

References

1883 births
1975 deaths
German male non-fiction writers